The Roman Catholic Metropolitan Archdiocese of Rijeka is a Latin Catholic Metropolitan archdiocese in Croatia.

Its episcopal seat is Rijeka Cathedral, dedicated to Saint Vitus, in the city of Rijeka. Other major churches include the former cathedral, dedicated to Saints Philip and James, located in nearby Novi Vinodolski, and a minor basilica, the Basilica of the Blessed Virgin, in the suburb of Trsat.

Ecclesiastical province 
Its Suffragan bishoprics are :
 Roman Catholic Diocese of Gospić–Senj
 Roman Catholic Diocese of Krk 
 Roman Catholic Diocese of Poreč i Pula

History 
 Established on April 30, 1920 as Apostolic Administration of Rijeka, of territory split off from Diocese of Senj–Modruš
 Promoted on April 25, 1925 as Diocese of Rijeka–Opatija, having gained territories from Diocese of Ljubljana, again the Diocese of Senj–Modruš and Diocese of Trieste (Italy; which it gained additional territory from in 1934)
 Promoted on July 27, 1969 as Metropolitan Archdiocese of Rijeka–Senj, having gained once more territory from the above, newly suppressed Diocese of Senj–Modruš, adopting the front half of its title
 Lost territory on 1977.10.17 to Diocese of Koper (Slovenia)
 Renamed on May 25, 2000 as Metropolitan Archdiocese of Rijeka
 Enjoyed a Papal visit by Pope John Paul II in June 2003.

Statistics 

As per 2014, it pastorally served 213,650 Catholics (80.1% of 266,800 total) on 2,580 km² in 90 parishes and 4 missions with 122 priests (83 diocesan, 39 religious), 1 deacon, 202 lay religious (43 brothers, 159 sisters) and 15 seminarians.

Episcopal ordinaries
Apostolic Administrators of Rijeka
 Father Celso Benigno Luigi Costantini (剛恆毅) (1920.04.30 – 1921.07.21); later Titular Bishop of Hierapolis (1921.07.22 – 1922.09.09) as Apostolic Delegate (papal diplomatic envoy) to China (1922.08.12 – 1933.11.03), Titular Archbishop of Theodosiopolis in Arcadia (1922.09.09 – 1953.01.12), Founder of Congregation of the Disciples of the Lord (1931.03.31), Apostolic Administrator of Harbin 哈爾濱 (China) (1931.05.28 – 1933.11.03), Secretary of Sacred Congregation of the Propagation of the Faith (1935.12.20 – 1953.01.12), created Cardinal-Priest of Ss. Nereo ed Achilleo (1953.01.15 – 1958.06.09), Chancellor of Apostolic Chancery (1954.05.22 – 1958.10.17), cardinal title transferred as Cardinal-Priest of S. Lorenzo in Damaso (1958.06.09 – 1958.10.17)
 Isidoro Sain, Benedictine (O.S.B.) (1923 – 1925.04.25)

Suffragan Bishops of Rijeka – Opatija
 Isidoro Sain, O.S.B. (1925.04.25 – death 1932.01.28)
 Antonio Santin (1933.08.10 – 1938.05.16), later Bishop of Koper (Slovenia) (1938.05.16 – 1975.06.28), Bishop of Trieste (Italy) (1938.05.16 – 1975.06.28), created Archbishop ad personam (1963.07.13 – death 1981.03.17)
 Ugo Camozzo (1938.08.17 – 1948.01.13), later Metropolitan Archbishop of Pisa (Italy) (1948.01.13 – 1970.09.22), emeritate as Titular Archbishop of Hirina (1970.09.22 – death 1977.07.07)
Apostolic Administrator Josep Srebrnic (1949 – 1952), while Bishop of Krk (Croatia) (1923.09.15 – death 1966.06.21), later created Archbishop ad personam (1963.03.02 – 1966.06.21)
Apostolic Administrator Viktor Burić (1952 – 1969.08.20 see below), while Bishop of Senj–Modruš (Croatia) (1935.05.21 – 1969.08.20)

Metropolitan Archbishops of Rijeka – Senj
 Viktor Burić (see above 1969.08.20 – retired 1974.04.18), died 1983
 Josip Pavlišić (1974.04.18 – retired 1990.01.05), died 200 ; previously Titular Bishop of Bruzus (1951.12.13 – 1969.08.20) as Auxiliary Bishop of Senj–Modruš (Croatia) (1951.12.13 – 1969.08.20), then Titular Archbishop of Pićan (1969.08.20 – 1974.04.18) and (succeeding) Coadjutor Archbishop of Rijeka–Senj (1969.08.20 – 1974.04.18)
 Anton Tamarut (1990.01.05 – 2000.05.25 see below), previously Bishop of Šibenik (Croatia) (1986.02.05 – 1987.12.04), (succeeding) Coadjutor Archbishop of Rijeka–Senj (1987.12.04 – 1990.01.05)

Metropolitan Archbishops of Rijeka
 Anton Tamarut (2000.05.25 – death 2000.06.28)
 Ivan Devčić (17 November 2000 – 11 October 2022)
 Mate Uzinić (11 October 2022 – present)

See also 
 Roman Catholicism in Croatia
 Roman Catholic Diocese of Senj-Modruš

References

Sources and external links 
 GCatholic.org, with Google map and satellite photo
 Catholic Hierarchy
  Diocese website

Roman Catholic dioceses in Croatia
Christian organizations established in 1920
Culture in Rijeka
Roman Catholic dioceses and prelatures established in the 20th century